Southampton is the largest city in Hampshire, England.

Southampton may also refer to:

Canada 
 Southampton, New Brunswick
 Southampton Parish, New Brunswick
 Southampton, Nova Scotia
 Southampton, Ontario
 Southampton Island in Nunavut

United Kingdom
 Southampton (UK Parliament constituency), abolished in 1950
 Southampton F.C.
 Port of Southampton
 University of Southampton
 Earl of Southampton
 Duke of Southampton
 Baron Southampton
 Southampton Parish, Bermuda, British overseas territory

United States 
 Southampton, Massachusetts
 Southampton, St. Louis, Missouri, a neighborhood in the southwest portion of the city
 South Hampton, New Hampshire
 Southampton Township, New Jersey
 Southampton, New York
 Southampton (village), New York
 Southampton, Pennsylvania
 Southampton Township, Bedford County, Pennsylvania
 Southampton Township, Cumberland County, Pennsylvania
 Southampton Township, Franklin County, Pennsylvania
 Southampton Township, Somerset County, Pennsylvania
 Southampton, Houston, Texas, a neighborhood in the southwest portion of the city
 Southampton County, Virginia

Naval forces
HMS Southampton (1693), a 48-gun fourth rate
HMS Southampton (1757), a 32-gun fifth rate
HMS Southampton (1820), a 60-gun fourth rate Southampton-class frigate launched in 1820
HMS Southampton (1912), a 1910 Town-class cruiser
HMS Southampton (83), a 1936 Town-class cruiser launched in 1936
HMS Southampton (D90), a Type 42 destroyer launched in 1979
USS Southampton (1841), a side-wheel steamer
USS Southampton (AKA-66), a Tolland-class attack cargo ship that served from 1944 until 1946

Other uses
Southampton station (disambiguation), stations of the name
Supermarine Southampton, a British 1930s flying boat
Southampton Dock, a song by Pink Floyd

See also
 Bloomsbury Square, formerly Southampton Square, London
 South Hampton (disambiguation)
 Southampton Row, Camden, London
 Southampton Street, London